Laytown-Bettystown-Mornington is a census town in East Meath, County Meath, Ireland, comprising the adjoining villages of Laytown, Bettystown and Mornington. It had a population of 5,597 at the 2002 census, 10,889 at the 2011 census, and 11,872 as of the 2016 census. The coastline stretches from the River Boyne, which borders County Louth to the River Delvin, which borders County Dublin. This stretch of beach is 11 km (7 mi) long and constitutes the whole County Meath coastline.

References

Towns and villages in County Meath
Articles on towns and villages in Ireland possibly missing Irish place names